Peter Edward Murchie (born 7 January 1986) is a Scottish professional rugby union coach for Glasgow Warriors and a former Scotland international player. He previously was an Assistant Coach for Stade Niçois; and Head Coach for Ayr and then the Ayrshire Bulls. He formerly played for Glasgow Warriors in the Guinness Pro12, making over 100 appearances for the club. His playing position was full-back.

Rugby union career

Amateur career

He started his career at North Dorset where he came through their mini and youth sides before leaving to join professional side Bath Rugby. He moved to Waterloo then Birmingham & Solihull R.F.C. and then signed for London Welsh RFC just as they turned professional. On moving to Scotland he has played for Dundee HSFP, Stirling County RFC and Aberdeen GSFP RFC as well as professional side Glasgow Warriors.

Professional career

He first joined Bath Rugby before moving to various lower league English clubs.

Murchie signed for London Welsh in 2008, when the club turned professional.

He signed for Glasgow Warriors in 2009. He made his competitive debut for the club on 4 September 2009, becoming Glasgow Warrior No. 174.

On 21 August 2015 it was announced at a Glasgow Warriors Open Day training session that Murchie would take over the captaincy of the club on a short-term basis while the squad's Scotland players were at the 2015 World Cup.

He played more than 100 times for Glasgow Warriors. On 4 May 2017 it was announced by Glasgow Warriors that Murchie would be leaving the club at the end of the season.

International career

Murchie's father is from Ayr and used to play rugby for Ardrossan Academicals. Despite having caps for England Under 18 both Murchie and his father were keen on a career in Scotland: ""[My father has] always been keen to get me back north of the border so this move realises an ambition for the two of us".

He represented Scotland A during their unbeaten 2010–11 and 2011–12 campaigns.

On 24 October 2012 he was named in the full Scottish national team for the 2012 end-of-year rugby union tests.

Coaching career

On 25 July 2017 it was announced that Murchie would be a player/coach at Stade Niçois in France. This was part of a wider tie-up between Scottish Rugby and Stade Nicois.

On 5 January 2018 it was announced that Murchie was retiring on medical advice and took up a coaching position working for Scottish rugby in the academies.

On 21 February 2018 it was announced that Murchie would take over as Ayr RFC head coach, who play in the Scottish Premiership.

On 14 December 2019 Murchie was announced as the Head Coach for the Ayr Super6 team, after a Scottish Rugby competition restructuring.

Murchie coached Ayr RFC to a league and cup double for the 2018/2019 season after a last minute victory in the cup final played at BT Murrayfield.

On 5 March 2021 it was announced that Peter Murchie would become an Assistant Coach for Glasgow Warriors, concentrating on Skills coaching.

References

External links
 itsrugby.co.uk profile

1986 births
Living people
Aberdeen GSFP RFC players
Bath Rugby players
Birmingham & Solihull R.F.C. players
Dundee HSFP players
Glasgow Warriors coaches
Glasgow Warriors players
London Welsh RFC players
Rugby union fullbacks
Rugby union players from Carlisle, Cumbria
Scotland 'A' international rugby union players
Scotland international rugby union players
Scottish rugby union coaches
Scottish rugby union players
Stirling County RFC players
Waterloo R.F.C. players